The 2006 Toledo Rockets football team represented the University of Toledo during the 2004 NCAA Division I-A football season. They competed as a member of the Mid-American Conference (MAC) in the West Division. The Rockets were led by head coach Tom Amstutz. The Rockets offense scored 432 points while the defense allowed 404 points.

Schedule

References

Toledo
Toledo Rockets football seasons
Toledo Rockets football